Banamba is the capital of Banamba Cercle, one of the seven Cercles of the Koulikoro Region of Mali.  Its estimated 2008 population is 7000.   The town lies due north of the regional capital of Koulikoro, and is connected by a 40 km all-weather road via the town of Sirakorola, about halfway between the two.  It is the location of the Lycée Franco-Arabe de Banamba.

Physical layout
It takes about twenty minutes to walk from one end to the other.  There are old neighborhoods with narrow, winding alleys, and newer neighborhoods (particularly the NE) with a grid of wider streets.  The market, the great mosque, the pharmacy, the post office, the Cercle building, the library, and the schools are all close together.  Roads approach the town from all directions; the roads from Koulikoro (to the South) and from Kiban (to the East) are laterite.  A line of ponds, dry before the rainy season, lies to the West of the market.

Ethnic groups, customs

The main ethnic groups found in Banamba are the Bambara, the Soninke, and the Fulani.  The original settlers, whose family names are Simpara and Makaji, are related to the Soninke.  Everyone speaks Bambara except some of the bush people, particularly Fulani, who come in to market on Mondays, though other languages can be heard, including Moor.

On holidays (Muhammad's birthday and baptism, Ramadan, Tabaski) women dance to drums in various little corners around town.  Sometimes on moonlit nights children dance to xylophone.

Banamba has a day reserved for weddings in June each year, and on that day dozens of marriages take place.

A day in March or April is marked for seining the fish out of the ponds.  Until that day the fish are untouched.  Then dozens of men and boys wade in with their homemade nets.

Social life, sports
There are several soccer teams that play regularly.  People play basketball and volleyball and ping pong at the lycée.  Day to day social life consists mainly of walks around town chatting with passersby or making tea with family and friends.  There are movies every night, including an occasional drama amid the karate spectacles.  Dances are held at the school as often as once a month.

Surrounding area
Touba is within cycling distance.  It is the home of a famous (so say the locals) Arabic school and a beautiful mosque on a hill.  The town is divided by two Muslim sects (one of the Wahhabite) who do not get along well enough to share water.

Kiban is also nearby and sports a pretty little mosque.

Sirakola (Koulikoro Cercle) has a large market on Thursdays, on which days there is plenty of public transportation.

There is a big hill to the West, visible from town, and a couple smaller ones about five kilometers to the North on the road to Nara.  The hills to the North are piles of bare boulders, hosts to hardy baobabs, good for watching sunsets.

Administrative structure
Banamba town is the administrative center of Banamba Cercle, which contains nine Communes, including Banamba. The Commune of Banamba contains not only the town itself, but is the administrative center for the following urban Quarters and rural villages:

Badoucourebougou
Bakaribougou
Bamarobougou
Banamba
Bougounina
Dankolo
Diangalambougou
Diassani
Diatouroubougou
Fadabougou
Falembougou
Galo
Galo-Marka
Gana
Kassela
Kolondialan
Kouna
Madina
N'galamadiby
N'ganou
N'ganouba
Ouleny-Marka
Ouleny-Peulh
Sabalibougou
Sinzena
Tiontala
Tomba
Zambougou

References

Banamba, Mali Page, Falling Rain .com.

Communes of Koulikoro Region